Asif Afridi (born 25 December 1986) is a Pakistani former first-class cricketer who is currently banned to play cricket in Pakistan for two years.

Career
Afridi was played in 2017–18 Quaid-e-Azam Trophy and was the leading wicket-taker for Federally Administered Tribal Areas (FATA), with 30 dismissals in seven matches. He was also the leading wicket-taker for FATA in the 2018–19 Quaid-e-Azam Trophy, with thirty dismissals in seven matches.

In January 2021, Afridi was named in Khyber Pakhtunkhwa's squad for the 2020–21 Pakistan Cup. In the final of the tournament, he took a five-wicket haul, to be named the player of the match and the bowler of the tournament.

In March 2022, Afridi was named in Pakistan's One Day International (ODI) and Twenty20 International (T20I) squads for their series against Australia.

On 7 February 2023, Afridi was banned by the Pakistan Cricket Board (PCB) from all cricket for a period of two years. He had pleaded guilty to two violations of the PCB’s anti-corruption code. He had failed to report an approach “to engage in corrupt conduct” during the National Twenty20 Cup.

References

External links
 

1986 births
Living people
Pakistani cricketers
Federally Administered Tribal Areas cricketers
Cricketers from Peshawar
Pashtun people
Khyber Pakhtunkhwa cricketers
Multan Sultans cricketers